The Women's 100 metres L2 was a sprinting event in athletics at the 1984 Summer Paralympics. It was one of few events that year not to be contested by at least three athletes. The only two competitors were Wilma Lawrie of Great Britain and Terri Dixon of the United States. Lawrie completed the race in 24.91s to take gold, well ahead of Dixon, who obtained silver upon finishing the race in 31.13s.

References 

Women's 100 metres L2